Coleophora captiosa is a moth of the family Coleophoridae. It is found in Turkestan and Mongolia.

The larvae feed on Haloxylon aphyllum. They create a leafy case, consisting of a thin caudal tube (the initial case rolled from cut skin of first mine) and two apices of hollowed branches. The valve is undeveloped and the adult moves out of the case through the caudal tube. Larvae can be found from September to October.

Subspecies
Coleophora captiosa captiosa
Coleophora captiosa maior Baldizzone, 1994

References

captiosa
Moths described in 1972
Moths of Asia